Consolidated Communications Holdings, Inc., doing business as Consolidated Communications, is an American broadband and business communications provider headquartered in Mattoon, Illinois. The company provides data, internet, voice, managed and hosted, cloud and IT services to business customers, and internet, TV, phone and home security services to residential customers. With 36,000 fiber route miles, it is a top ten fiber provider in the U.S., serving customers in 23 states.

Consolidated Communications began trading on the NASDAQ under ticker symbol CNSL in 2005.

History 
Consolidated Communications was founded as the Mattoon Telephone Company in 1894 by Dr.  Iverson A. Lumpkin in Mattoon, Illinois. In 1924, the company became the Illinois Consolidated Telephone Company (ICTC) and began acquiring telephone companies in the region over the next several decades, including telephone companies in Christian County, Montgomery County, the Illinois Southeastern Telephone Company and the Effingham, Illinois exchange from Illinois Bell. In 1984, Consolidated Communications, Inc. (CCI) was formed as the parent company of ICTC, Consolidated Communications Directories and Consolidated Market Response.

In 1997, CCI merged with McLeodUSA, but was purchased back in 2002 by ICTC Chairman and President Richard A. Lumpkin and investors. The company name was then changed to Consolidated Communications.

In March 2020, Consolidated Communications announced that employees and the company have pledged $80,000 to support United Way organizations in communities across the company's service area.

States 
The company offers Internet, traditional landline phone or VoIP, Home Security, Premium Television, Web Hosting and wholesale data) in 23 states across the United States.

Acquisition History 
 In April 2004, Consolidated Communications acquired Texas-based TXU Communications.
 In December 2007, Consolidated Communications acquired North Pittsburgh Systems Inc., including North Pittsburgh Telephone Company, Nauticom and Penn Telecom.
 In July 2012, Consolidated Communications acquired SureWest Communications, extending the company's reach to Roseville and Sacramento, California and Kansas City.
 In October 2014, Consolidated Communications acquired Enventis Corporation, formerly HickoryTech, adding operations in Minnesota, Iowa, Wisconsin, South Dakota and North Dakota to the company's portfolio.
 In July 2016, Consolidated Communications acquired Champaign Telephone Company (CTC), a business communications provider in the Champaign-Urbana, Illinois area.
 In July 2017, Consolidated Communications acquired FairPoint Communications, expanding the company's service area to 24 states.

References

External links
 
 Official web portal

1894 establishments in Illinois
American companies established in 1894
Telecommunications companies of the United States
Internet service providers of the United States
Telecommunications companies established in 1894
Companies based in Coles County, Illinois
Companies listed on the Nasdaq
2005 initial public offerings